, also known as simply Symphogear, is a Japanese anime television franchise animated by Satelight. The original season aired on Tokyo MX between January and March 2012. The second season entitled Symphogear G aired between July and September 2013, The third season, Symphogear GX, aired between July and September 2015, and the fourth season, Symphogear AXZ, aired between July and September 2017. The fifth and final season, Symphogear XV, aired between July and September 2019. A manga adaptation was serialized in Kadokawa Shoten's Newtype Ace magazine between November 2011 and April 2013. A mobile game titled Symphogear XD UNLIMITED was released in June 2017 in Japan.

Plot
Two idols, Tsubasa Kazanari and Kanade Amō, collectively known as Zwei Wing, battle against an alien race known as Noise using armor known as Symphogear, which uses the power of music to counteract the Noise's destructive capability. However, Kanade sacrifices herself to protect a girl named Hibiki Tachibana, who ends up with a piece of Kanade's Symphogear relic, Gungnir, embedded in her chest. Two years later, Hibiki awakens the power of the Gungnir relic inside her body, gaining the same Symphogear armor that Kanade had. Using the power of song, Hibiki and her fellow Symphogear wielders must fight to protect the innocent and defeat those who would use the Noise for evil.

Characters

Symphogear Users
Collectively termed as Symphogear Adaptors, these are the main protagonist of the franchise.

Furthermore, Symphogear users can access its , an extremely powerful attack that can normally used in critical situations, though the damage inflicted by the Superb Song is determined by the compatibility coefficients, if the coefficient of compatibility is high, less damage will be done. In some worst cases, using a Superb Song while in a critical condition, or when the effects of "LiNKER" wearing off, can lead to fatal feedback for the user, potentially killing them and/or their Symphogear in the process.

Symphogears can only be used by compatible Candidates, though some characters can bypass the synchronization requirement, either through the use of a "LiNKER" drug or by being fused with a relic.

A cheerful, rather childish but sometimes cautious schoolgirl who attends the same school as Tsubasa. Two years ago, while attending a Zwei Wing concert, she was nearly killed by the Noise, barely surviving thanks to the sacrifice of Kanade, who taught her never to accept death. During the first episode, when she becomes cornered by the Noise, she sings the same song she heard Kanade sing and ends up gaining Symphogear powers due a fragment of Kanade's armor that entered her body that day. Whenever she becomes really angry, she sometimes enters a state of frenzy. She is seen capable of using Durandal, and uses it in the final battle against Finé with the help of her friends. She was thought to be dead after destroying a large section of the moon to save Earth, along with Tsubasa and Chris, but she actually survived, along with the others.

In the second season, it is shown that the Gungnir relic is spreading through her body, growing more with every transformation, which gives her increasingly explosive power but will eventually lead to Gungnir bursting out from inside her body and killing her. She manages to cure this thanks to the laser from Miku's gear removing hers, completely cleanse her body of Gungnir fragment thus fully disabling her transformation. In the final battle at the Frontier she manages to revive her Symphogear by using energy from Maria's Gungnir. Her past is also revealed that she was bullied due to her survival from the previous attack.

In the epilogue of the fourth season, it is revealed that Hibiki and Miku were purged from the "original sin", or more accurately the Curse of Balal, when they were hit by the ShenshouJing's negating laser. This might be the reason why Hibiki turned into a Divine Weapon when the divine power is fused within her in the near season finale.

Her Symphogear is the SG-r03', codenamed , which originally belonged to Kanade. However, since it is only a fragment, she originally possesses less armor compared to the original, though the armor itself is capable of transforming in the same manner as an Armed Gear to a limited degree. She compensates for this by specializing in powerful martial arts, using short bursts of energy and multiple pistons in its armor to power her punches or launch herself at great distances. Her Armed Gear is her hands, figuratively and literally, which materialized as numerous types of piston or jet-powered gauntlets, as well as to absorb the excess energy generated by other Symphogears' Superb Song and redirect it into a combination attack. After regaining her Symphogear through Maria's relic near the end of G, she has since having access to jet-powered gauntlets or a drill as her Armed Gear.
She is also notable that unlike the remaining gear users, she doesn't possess any significant weapons arming on her side except for her hands, which have been upgraded with powerful punching abilities.

A girl who has the power to use Symphogear armor, which uses music to fight off against aliens known as Noise. After the death of her partner Kanade, to whom she is rather attached with after witnessing Kanade's urge to fight the noise, Tsubasa became quiet, cold and aloof. She is very reluctant to work with Hibiki, refusing to accept her as Kanade's replacement, but she and Hibiki eventually get to be good friends. She is also a rather popular pop idol, though she refuses to sing in concerts or accept proposals to release her songs internationally, viewing herself only as a weapon that sings only to fight. However, after "talking" to Kanade after singing her superb song, Tsubasa starts to open up to Hibiki, and even sings in the place where Kanade was killed, and later, accepting a contract overseas. She "dies" in the explosion of Kadingir, when she destroys it, but was revived with the Symphogear. She was thought to be dead once again after destroying a large section of the moon to save Earth, along with Hibiki and Chris, but she actually survived, along with the others. Her weapon is a katana. Officially she is granddaughter and the first heir of Fudō Kazanari (which later be the villain in XV when he and Yatsuhiro discuss about the divine power and getting it for themselves), the current head of Kazanari family, daughter of Yatsuhiro Kazanari, a high-ranking national security official, and niece of Genjūrō Kazanari, commander of Special Disaster Response Team Section Two. Biologically she is the daughter of Fudō Kazanari and younger half-sister of Yatsuhiro and Genjūrō Kazanari.
Her Symphogear is the SG-r01, codenamed  (Totsuka-no-Tsurugi), a Symphogear designed for precise close-quarters combat due to its ability to manifest blades all over the user's body. Her Armed Gear is a katana, which can increase its size to match the power needed to overpower stronger Noise.

A mysterious half-Japanese girl who works under the main villain, Finé. Chris wields the stolen , and has the ability to summon and command Noise at will through the use of a relic called "Solomon's Cane"; she also possesses a Symphogear, but refuses to use it because of her hatred of singing. Chris works with Finé in order to fulfill her wish of stopping wars by killing all those with the power and will to fight. This is because, eight years prior, Chris' parents  and  took Chris with them to South America to use music performances to help the refugees of a civil war. However, Masanori and Sonnet were killed in a terrorist bombing, and Chris herself was kidnapped and sold into sex slavery. Two years before the series, she was rescued by the UN and returned to Japan; Section Two then arranged to take her in, but Chris was instead kidnapped by Finé to be used as a tool for her plans. However, Finé ends up abandoning Chris when Chris does not live up to her expectations. Chris then sides with Hibiki and Tsubasa against Finé. Chris "dies" while trying to protect the moon from Finé's Kadingir, fulfilling her parents' dream of bringing peace to the world with her song, but Chris is later revived by the song of the Lydian students. Chris is thought to be dead once again after destroying a large section of the moon to save Earth, along with Tsubasa and Hibiki, but she manages to survive. Afterwards, Chris officially joins the Special Disaster Response Team Section Two. 
Her Symphogear is the SG-r02, codenamed , a Symphogear specialized for long-ranged supportive offense. Her Armed Gear is a crossbow, but due to Chris' violent imagination, it can change into several types of guns and missiles, sometimes able to wield multiple guns and missiles all at once.

Debuting in Symphogear G. An energetic singer of Ukrainian origin, who reached the top of the American music charts about two months after her debut. Although it has a mysterious quality, her vigorous singing voice has crossed over international borders and garnered a large number of wild and enthusiastic fans throughout the world. To bring forth justice, she has risen as an enemy against all of humanity, clad in a Gungnir Symphogear that is outside of the Japanese government’s control. Her weapon is a second Gungnir, with a spear similar in form to Kanade's but with different features including a powerful cannon mode. Maria initially claims to be the newest reincarnation of Finé, but this is eventually revealed to be a ruse. Like Kanade, Maria is reliant on LiNKER to maintain synchronization with her Symphogear, giving her a time limit in battle and causing her superb song to be potentially fatal. In GX she briefly uses Hibiki's Gungnir to protect her friends from the Alca-Noise, and later thanks to Elfnein she starts using Serena's relic Airgetlam. 
Her Symphogear is the SG-x00, codenamed , a special Syphogear known for its versatility and adaptability. Her Armed Gear takes the form of a whip-sword that can be used in many different ways, either as a throwing knife or a combat knife, as well as a powerful railgun.

Debuting in Symphogear G. One of the mysterious Symphogear users who coordinates with Maria’s team. Although she appears docile on the outside, she is actually a bold tactician that has frequently used any means necessary to meet her goals. She harbors strong feelings of distrust against Hibiki, who has been named a hero after saving the Earth from a moon fragment, and she will constantly belittle Hibiki’s actions by calling her a "hypocrite". Later in the battle between her and Kirika, it is revealed that she is the true host of the reincarnated Finé. In GX, she is redeemed and regrets her actions before she personally apologizes to Hibiki.
In XV, it is revealed that prior to arriving at FIS, she was caught in a car accident that killed her parents and gave her amnesia. As a result, she does not remember her real name. Her current name was one assigned to her based on the belongings she had with her at the time.
Her Symphogear is the SG-i01, codenamed , a Syphogear designed for mobility and lethality, with her Armed Gear being the many disc blades stored in several parts of her body.

Debuting in Symphogear G. Kirika is another one of the mysterious Symphogear users. Although she has a very straightforward cheerful and cooperative personality, she harbors a shadowy past as one of the "Receptor Children" who was treated as an observation subject at a certain research facility along with Maria, Serena, Shirabe and others. The bonds between Kirika and her friends are so strong that she feels no fear from fighting against the entire world. Thought to be the true host of the reincarnated Finé when she suddenly uses Finé's powers to protect herself and Shirabe from falling debris, it is later revealed in the battle between her and Shirabe, that Shirabe is the actual host. Stressed with the loss of her assumed identity Kirika attempts suicide with Igalima out of guilt resulting in Igalima killing Shirabe by accident when moving Kirika out of the path of the attack.

In a flashback in AXZ Episode 9, back to when Kirika and Shirabe first met Kirika said she didn't remember her birthday. One episode later, after nearly killing herself with the result in a LiNKER overdose she tells Hibiki how she never knew her own birthday and how she wants everyone to be happy on them at any cost before falling unconscious.
Her character songs from G and GX mention small parts of her past. "Tegami" mentions how she probably lived in famine conditions, while "Okitegami" says that she's a bombing victim. Out of everyone, Kirika doesn't have any trace of blood family nor any memories of her past. Her history is the most unknown along with Shirabe. She often ends her sentences with Death .
 Her Symphogear is the SG-i02, codenamed , a Symphogear made to deal with multiple hordes of Noise at once. Her Armed Gear is a scythe, which can change its appearance for increased lethality.

Hibiki's best friend, who shares a dorm with her. After a Noise attack, she figures out Hibiki's secret, where they have a little trouble in their friendship, but Miku eventually joins Special Disaster Response Team Section Two to help Hibiki. In the second season, she is controlled and corrupted by Dr. Ver into becoming the user of the relic Shénshòujìng as a part of his plans to locate and unlock the Frontier. She is freed from it after Hibiki puts her in the path of her own negating laser. In XDU, Miku uses the Shenshoujing to fight Hibiki's alternate counterpart from a parallel world.
In the epilogue of the fourth season, it is revealed that Hibiki and Miku were purged from the "original sin", or more accurately the Curse of Balal, when they were hit by the Shenshoujing's negating laser.
Her Symphogear is the SG-i03, codenamed , a Symphogear made to negate relics and its powers. Her Armed Gear are several reflective mirrors she can use to fire lasers that can negate the effects of relics.

Supporting characters

Tsubasa's former partner who fought alongside her. Five years ago, when her family was killed in a Noise attack, she was given harsh medical treatment to make her body compatible with the Gungnir relic, to which she consented to, hoping to avenge them. She had since performed alongside Tsubasa, growing an appreciation for letting others hear her songs and forming the vocal duo, Zwei Wing. Two years ago, she sacrificed herself to protect Hibiki during a Noise attack, singing her superb song which destroyed them and herself. During the attack, a piece of her armor was implanted in Hibiki's body, allowing her to use the same powers. She continues to support Tsubasa in her times of need through her spirit and Tsubasa's dreams.
Her Symphogear is the SG-r03, codenamed Gungnir, which is the original incarnation of Hibiki's Symphogear, but has more armor and has an Armed Gear which is a lance.

The commander of Special Disaster Response Team Section Two. He is also Tsubasa's uncle (officially), her older half-brother (biologically), and a fan of action movies. His physical strength is strong enough to deflect Tsubasa's Symphogear and her Armed Gear alone. After the first attack by Chris, he becomes Hibiki's teacher in martial arts at her request. He blames himself for his agents not being able to find Chris when she was kidnapped by Finé two years ago, but Genjūrō and Chris make up and she willingly cooperates with Tsubasa and Hibiki under Genjūrō's supervision only. He starts to get suspicious of Ryōko's activities.

Head scientist of Special Disaster Response Team Section Two and creator of the Symphogear. She has the ability to form powerful force-fields. She tends to sexually harass Hibiki and shows inappropriate interest in her. Her loyalties are somehow questionable, as she concerns herself more over the Symphogears and related relic experiments. Ryōko is revealed to be in actuality the main antagonist, Finé, who had possessed Ryōko's body and erased her consciousness long ago, for Finé's ultimate goal of using the power of Kadingir (Sumerian name of Babylon) to destroy the moon and bring about chaos on Earth.

One of the agents of Special Disaster Response Team Section Two and Tsubasa's manager during her shows. He is an experienced veteran fighter, who is able to fight without having a gear. This allows him to help the girls in some part, though his role is mostly supportive rather than taking direct combat.

She works in Special Disaster Response Team Section Two and is always in the underground part of the school.

He works in Special Disaster Response Team Section Two and is always in the underground part of the school.

Debuting in Symphogear G. Maria’s younger sister who successfully became a Symphogear user and displays unparalleled talent. With her calm and gentle personality, she feels hesitant to use her gear’s power for the purpose of fighting. Her tender singing voice soothes Maria’s soul, and her smile has become the very foundation of Maria’s determination. Five years ago, she sacrificed herself by singing her superb song to seal the Nephilim that was rampaging to protect Maria, Nastassja and the other scientists.

A Russian heretical engineer who supports the operations of Maria’s team. After the events of the "Lunar Attack", one segment of information regarding the sacred relics was released to the public, however the knowledge that Nastassja holds is far greater than that. Although she looks upon Maria’s team with kind eyes, in order to help them achieve their difficult mission she intentionally treats them very strictly. She uses a wheelchair.

Debuting in Symphogear GX. A girl from the world of alchemy who bears a resemblance to Carol. She comes before the other Symphogear users to provide them with a means of combating the Alca-Noise. From the end of GX onwards, she works with S.O.N.G as their mechanic.

Minor characters

Hibiki and Miku's classmate and friend. An anime-lover, a running gag involves her proclaiming how life is similar to an anime.

Another one of Hibiki and Miku's classmates and friends. Calls Hibiki, Miku, and Chris by the nicknames "Bikki", "Hina", and "Kinechri", respectively.

Another one of Hibiki and Miku's classmates and friends. Calls her friends by their last names.

Debuting in Symphogear G. Classmates of Chris, who attempt to befriend her despite her attempts at avoiding them. Komichi is the girl with long brown hair and a yellow headband; Yuki is the girl with long dark-green hair in a high ponytail; and Otome is the girl with short brown hair and glasses.

Debuting in Symphogear G. Classmates of Tsubasa. Ayumu is the girl with short brown hair and a willow's peak; Tōko is the girl with short blonde hair held back with a white headband; and Ako is the girl with bangs and short dark-brown hair that curls outwards.

Owner of Flower

A woman who runs the okonomiyaki shop named "Flower", which Hibiki, Miku, and other classmates from Lydian visit frequently. Her real name is unknown.

The head of the music company "Metro Music", who supports Tsubasa and her music performances.

The Minister of Defence, who supports Special Disaster Response Team Section Two. He is assassinated by the American government on the order of Finé so that she, as Ryoko in disguise, can get a new Minister of Defence elected who will unintentionally further the construction of Kadingir, as Hiroki was against Finé's plans to do so.

Debuting in Symphogear G. The Vice Minister of Foreign Affairs. He is often caught up in dealing with the complexities of current world affairs, but his main duty is to protect the Japanese government’s national interest and the black art crystallized technology of the Symphogear system. Although he is often seen as having a rude personality, he is the only man that understands Genjūrō, and is generally a person who cooperates with the Special Disaster Response Team Section Two’s operations.

Debuting in Symphogear GX. Hibiki's father, who abandoned the family following the fall-out of the Zwei Wing concert tragedy. He reappears during Carol's attack to attempt to make amends with Hibiki and become part of the family again.

Debuting in Symphogear GX. Tsubasa's father (in fact, biological half-brother) and Genjūrō's brother. A government agent who carries out actions on the line between legal and illegal, he is the one who allowed Maria to transfer to SONG upon her request. Though Yatsuhiro treats his daughter, Tsubasa, coldly and calls her a "stained tool of the Kazanari clan", he truly cares about Tsubasa and only pushes her away in an attempt to allow her to follow her dreams as an idol. He dies in XV after shielding Tsubasa from a bullet fired by Fudō.

Debuting in Symphogear AXZ. Tsubasa's grandfather (in fact, biological father) and the father of Genjūrō and Yatsuhiro. Wishing for a pure-blooded heir to the Kazanari clan, Fudō impregnated Yatsuhiro's wife to give birth to Tsubasa.

Debuting in Symphogear AXZ. A woman from Val Verde who was a friend of Chris' mother and father, helping the Yukine family to realize their dream of bringing peace to the world with songs. Chris looked up to Sonia and thought of her as an older sister. However, due to Sonia's carelessness, terrorists were able to sneak a bomb into the camp the Yukine family resided in, killing both Chris' parents. Chris and Sonia were separated in the confusion; though Sonia managed to survive harm, Chris was captured by the terrorists and sold into slavery. Chris and Sonia meet again nine years later when SONG intervenes in Val Verde due to reports of Alca-Noise.

Debuting in Symphogear AXZ. Sonia's little brother, who played soccer. He and his village were enslaved, but after he is rescued by Hibiki during a conflict with the Alca-Noise, is able to request the help of Hibiki, Tsubasa, and Chris to free his village. However, Stephan's leg is grabbed by an Alca-Noise, and Chris is forced to shoot it off to stop Stephan from disintegrating entirely.

Antagonists

A mysterious woman responsible for Chris' attacks on Special Disaster Response Team Section Two. Finé wants to kidnap Hibiki in order to experiment on her fusion with Gungnir, as well as take the relics gathered by Section Two for her plans. Finé works with the American government to secure the relics and funding needed for her goals, and was the one who caused the Zwei Wing concert tragedy and stole the Nehushtan Armor two years prior to the series. Finé is convinced that only pain can unite human hearts, and uses this as a reason for whenever she sexually abuses or tortures Chris for punishment or entertainment. After Chris fails to live up to her expectations, Finé abandons her and takes the Nehushtan Armor for her own use. Finé's ultimate goal is to use the ion particle cannon, Kadingir, to destroy the moon, freeing humanity of the Curse of Balal, while also causing chaos via gravitational disturbances so that humanity will bow down in fear to her.

Finé is an ancient priestess who had served God and in time came to love Enki, though the true nature of this love is ambiguous. She built the Tower of Babel in an attempt to reach him, but her efforts were confounded when he threw down the tower and inflicted the Curse of Balal upon humanity. Undeterred, Finé sealed her soul in her genes so that her consciousness would awaken whenever one of her descendants would be exposed to the Aufwachen (awakening in German) wavelength given off by the relics. Due to this reason, she is essentially immortal, capable of resurrection so as long her DNA is passed down. Finé claims she was responsible for the paradigm shifts that had changed humanity throughout history, working through the bodies of her descendants. Finé works through Ryōko's body over the course of season one, until it is destroyed in the finale. Finé's consciousness then goes to Shirabe, but when Shirabe takes the hit which Kirika meant to commit suicide with, Finé takes the blow instead, and her soul dies protecting Shirabe.

In Symphogear GX, it is revealed by Carol that Finé was the one who began the practice of alchemy and songs as a means of uniting the world after the collapse of the Tower of Babel. In Symphogear AXZ, it is further revealed that the Bavarian Illuminati in fact founded the practice of alchemy using heretical technology leftover by Finé, but Finé defeated them in order to monopolize the technology for her own means.

A researcher who was transferred from the USA’s sacred relic research institution and works together with Special Disaster Response Team Section Two to analyze the Sakurai Theory, though this was quickly revealed as a ruse to secure Solomon's Cane. As an expert on biochemistry, he has demonstrated an aptitude for research involving the bonding of living organisms to sacred relics. Deeply ambitious, Ver is fascinated with the Symphogears and their users, and developed a more advanced form of the LiNKER drug that allows sync ratios to be raised by force along with a counteragent. He is also visibly insane, prone to sudden and extreme outbursts of emotion despite his normally calm demeanor. It's later revealed that he planned to make the moon crash to Earth so he can repopulate humanity himself. After the destruction of the Nephilim, he's imprisoned despite his desire of dying a hero and later on sentence to death.

In GX, is revealed he was imprisoned in the Undersea Dragon Palace because of the merging of his left arm with the Nephilim cells and saved Carol before she was defeated. He helps Carol power up the Chateau de Tiffauges, and she stabs him once his purpose is fulfilled. He helps Maria, Shirabe and Kirika deactivate the Chateau and ends up sacrificing himself to protect them from the destruction of the castle.

His surname was named after the legendary Gaul chieftain who led a failed anti-Roman uprising, Vercingetorix.

Debuting in Symphogear GX. A girl from a world of alchemy who seeks to destroy the world in order to avenge the death of her father. She is focused on destroying all the miracles in the world, particularly Hibiki. She has access to her own relic and can obtain an adult form in combat by sacrificing all her memories. After being defeated by Hibiki, Chris, and Tsubasa, she commits suicide in order to avoid being captured. It is later revealed that she has been resurrected following the destruction of Galie and Micha and that she has a connection to Elfnein, which allows her to use her senses. She planned for the destruction of the Autoscorers using the Ignite modes to power up the Chateau de Tiffauges and by disturbing the ley lines, she intended to use the Chateau to destroy the world and obtain all its knowledge. When Elfnein said that her father didn't want her to destroy the world, she admits that she's right, but also that she's too resentful toward the world to stop. When the Chateau de Tiffauges is destroyed, she refuses to surrender and uses all her memories to create a giant mechanical lion (based on Gregar from Mega Man Battle Network 6) to fight the heroines, only to be defeated when Hibiki combines the power of all their relics to destroy the Mechalion. She survived the battle but at the cost of all of her memories. After reconciling with the dying Elfnein, Carol and Elfnein merge into a single being so both can live at the same time, but at the great cost of erasing Carol's soul in the process. She returns in XV to help Elfnein save Miku, as well as to help the gear users (save for Hibiki) to fight Shem-Ha by providing phonic gain required to unlock the X-Drive for them. Later, she also tried to stop Shem-Ha while the gear users are in the Lunar Ruins but was defeated. After they return to Earth, she joins them for the final battle against Shem-Ha.

Debuting in Symphogear GX. One of the four Autoscorers Carol has under her command. Phara has incredible flexibility and wields a pair of swords. Her elemental affiliation is with Wind. She is destroyed by Tsubasa using her Ignite Module.

Debuting in Symphogear GX. An Autoscorer who uses coins to perform high speed projectile attacks. She also has a "little sister" Autoscorer who is capable of incredible destruction (which was later revealed that she has two bodies). Her elemental affiliation is with Earth. She is destroyed by Chris using her Ignite Module.

Debuting in Symphogear GX. An Autoscorer who can manipulate water to create illusions or form ice attacks. Her elemental affiliation is with Ice. She is destroyed by Maria using her Ignite Module.

Debuting in Symphogear GX. A combat-type Autoscorer who has a violent and psychotic personality, possessing claws and rocket-powered hair. Her elemental affiliation is with Fire. She is destroyed by Shirabe and Kirika in a combined attack with both of them using their Ignite Modules.

Debuting in Symphogear AXZ. An alchemist from the Bavarian Illuminati. A female beauty who dresses like a man. Having achieved mastery of alchemy through which a state of perfection can be obtained, Saint-Germain created for herself a perfect body which can live eternally. She now strives to create the power of God so she can free humanity from oppression. She has existed for at least four hundred years. Saint-Germain was born the daughter of a sex slave, and was abandoned by her father, with her mother later dying of sickness and malnutrition; this on top of her own abuses and molestations is why Saint-Germain wishes to free humanity from oppression. In the near finale of AXZ, joined by Cagliostro and Prelati, they use their lapis philosophorum's perfect purification to not only nullify the nuclear missile that was launched by America, but also turn its explosion into the Divine Power. However, it comes at a great price as their move destroys their bodies and turning into energy.

Debuting in Symphogear AXZ. An alchemist from the Bavarian Illuminati. She used to be a man who was a swindler known for his endless lies, before being granted a perfect body by Saint-Germain. Cagliostro has since sworn to never lie about her feelings.

Debuting in Symphogear AXZ. An alchemist from the Bavarian Illuminati. She used to be a man who indulged in luxury and pleasure, before being granted a perfect body by Saint-Germain, following his defeat at her hands. Prelati has since sworn to become an earnest researcher, but sometimes lets her preference for fun get in the way of her work.

Debuting in Symphogear AXZ. An Autoscorer from the Bavarian Illuminati. She was created by Adam to observe the motions of the planets and record them as star maps.

Debuting in Symphogear AXZ. An alchemist who is the founder of the Bavarian Illuminati. He is an individual whose lineage is shrouded in mystery. He was an Automaton created by the Custodians, but was rejected due to his fatal flaw, being a perfected and complete creature. Adam's ultimate goal was to take the Divine Power for himself to ensure that he would surpass the Custodians before they even get to Earth. However, with his plans failed and the Symphogears overpowering him, he's forced to reveal his true form: A giant Automaton demon. He is destroyed when Hibiki uses the power of Chrysopoeia, with the help of the spirits of the alchemists.

Debuting in Symphogear XV. She is the leader of the Bavarian Illuminati remnants known as Noble Red after Adam's death in AXZ. Her name references the Villa Diodati.

Debuting in Symphogear XV. She is a failed experiment by the Bavarian Illuminati to produce a vampire of legend. Her name references Carmilla.

Debuting in Symphogear XV. She was an experimental subject of the Bavarian Illuminati implanted with bestial DNA. Her name references the Beast of Gévaudan.

Debuting in Symphogear XV.

Media

On November 20, 2022, it was announced at the end of the "Symphogear Live 2020→2022" concert that a new project in the Symphogear franchise was being developed, to be released at an unannounced date.

Manga
A manga accompaniment to the series, illustrated by Dan Yoshii, was serialized in Kadokawa Shoten's NewType Ace magazine between November 2011 and April 2013.

Anime

The anime, produced by Satelight and Encourage Films, began airing in Japan on Tokyo MX between January 6, 2012, and March 30, 2012. Funimation Entertainment (now known as Crunchyroll) licensed the series for North America and simulcast the series on Nico Nico. The opening theme was "Synchrogazer" performed by Nana Mizuki, and the ending theme was "Meteor Light" performed by Ayahi Takagaki, with multiple character and insert songs performed by Aoi Yūki, Nana Mizuki, Ayahi Takagaki, Minami Takayama, and Yuka Iguchi used throughout the season. Discotek Media released this season on subtitled Blu-ray Disc in North America on October 27, 2020.

On September 5, 2012, Thomas Romain, an animator on the series, wrote on Twitter "for the ones who liked Symphogear, there will be good news soon!", later revealing on October 6, 2012, that production on a second season has begun. The second season, titled Senki Zesshō Symphogear G, aired between July 4, 2013, and September 26, 2013. The opening theme for the second season was "Vitalization" performed by Nana Mizuki, and the ending theme was "Next Destination" performed by Ayahi Takagaki, with multiple new character and insert songs performed by Aoi Yūki, Nana Mizuki, Ayahi Takagaki, Yōko Hikasa, Yoshino Nanjō, Ai Kayano, and Yuka Iguchi used throughout the season. Discotek Media released this season on subtitled Blu-ray Disc in North America on January 26, 2021.

A third season, titled Senki Zessho Symphogear GX, aired in Japan between July 4, 2015, and September 25, 2015, and was simulcast by Chernin-owned Crunchyroll. Crunchyroll also began streaming the first season from September 2, 2015, followed by Symphogear G on September 18, 2015. The opening theme for the third season was "Exterminate" performed by Nana Mizuki, and the ending theme was "Rebirth-day" performed by Ayahi Takagaki, with multiple new character and insert songs performed by Aoi Yūki, Nana Mizuki, Ayahi Takagaki, Yōko Hikasa, Yoshino Nanjō, Ai Kayano, Yuka Iguchi, and Inori Minase used throughout the season.

A fourth and fifth season were announced on February 28, 2016, at the Symphogear Live 2016 event in Japan, and are currently in production. The fourth season, titled Symphogear AXZ (pronounced "axis"), began airing between July 1, 2017, and September 30, 2017. The opening theme is "Testament" performed by Nana Mizuki, and the ending theme is "Futurism" performed by Ayahi Takagaki, with multiple new character and insert songs performed by Aoi Yūki, Nana Mizuki, Ayahi Takagaki, Yōko Hikasa, Yoshino Nanjō, Ai Kayano, Minako Kotobuki, Shōta Aoi, and Rina Hidaka.

The fifth  and final season, titled Symphogear XV, was originally scheduled to premiere in April 2019, but the airdate was pushed back to July 2019 in order to further refine the anime before its release. The fifth season aired between July 6, 2019, and September 28, 2019. The opening theme is "Metanoia" performed by Nana Mizuki, and the ending theme is "Lasting Song" performed by Ayahi Takagaki. Medialink licensed the fifth and final season in South and Southeast Asia and streaming this anime in their YouTube channel.

The Zwei Wing duo, Tsubasa and Kanade, made a paper cameo in Genshiken Second Season episode KOIBANA3, created by Manabu Kuchiki for a cosplay idea.

Video games
Characters from Symphogear appear in Super Heroine Chronicle, a role-playing game developed by Namco Bandai Games for PlayStation 3 and PlayStation Vita and released in Japan on February 6, 2014.

A smartphone game, Senki Zesshō Symphogear XD Unlimited, developed by Bushiroad, was released on June 26, 2017. An English version of the smartphone game was released by Pokelabo Games on February 14, 2020. However, quite possibly due to mismanagement and the likely lack of a large playerbase needed to maintain the game in the long run, the English version was shut down on July 31 of the same year, with all information about it purged from all official sites.

Reception
In the 2019 Anime UK News Readers' Choice Awards, Symphogear XV won the category for "Best TV Anime". Symphogear won the category for "Most Wanted Anime License", and was runner-up for the category of "Most Wanted Manga License". Hibiki and Miku were runner-up for the category of "Best Couple".

Notes

References

External links
  
  
  
  
  
  
 

2012 anime television series debuts
2013 anime television series debuts
2015 anime television series debuts
2017 anime television series debuts
2019 anime television series debuts
Action anime and manga
Anime with original screenplays
Discotek Media
Encourage Films
Funimation
Medialink
Kadokawa Shoten manga
LGBT in anime and manga
Magical girl anime and manga
Music in anime and manga
Satelight
Shōnen manga
Tokyo MX original programming